Suroboyo Bus is a city bus system in Surabaya, Indonesia. Suroboyo Bus was launched on April 7, 2018.

Routes

A smartphone application called GOBIS can detect and monitor the position of a Suroboyo Bus in real time.
At present Suroboyo Bus operates in three routes,
North - South Line (Rajawali - Purabaya vv.)
East - West Line (Lidah Wetan - UNESA - ITS - Kejawan vv.)
Middle East Ring Road (MERR) Line (Kenjeran - Gunung Anyar vv.)
Terminal Joyoboyo (TIJ) - Yono Suwoyo Line

Buses

Buses are 2.5 meters wide and 12 meters long, can carry as many as 67 people. Suroboyo Bus features some facilities, such as differentiated seats, CCTV, safe doors with sensors and an emergency button. Pink chairs are exclusively for women, while the orange chairs at the rear are for men. Seat differentiation is intended to minimize acts of sexual abuse towards women on the bus. 12 CCTV cameras are installed inside each bus, complemented by 3 CCTV cameras outside. Installation of CCTVs is to provide a sense of security for passengers. The bus door is equipped with sensors, that prevents the doors from closing if there are passengers standing near the door. The bus will not run until the door is completely closed. The buses also have an emergency anticipation system by using the emergency button. In the event of a fire or accident, the bus driver can press the button and the alarm will sound, which will trigger the doors to automatically open.

Operating hours and payment
Suroboyo Bus operating hours start at 06.00-22.00 WIB.

Suroboyo Bus' payment is unique, namely plastic waste (at one time it was the only payment accepted). This step is intended to reduce plastic waste which is a serious problem in the environment. Plastic waste paid will be collected and then deposited and sold for recycling. But now, it is possible for riders to pay using cashless payment. It costs IDR 5.000 for an adult to ride and half the price (IDR 2.500) for students and university students. Now, all of the busses have yellow registration plates which accepts cashless payment using QR code (QRIS) or electronic money. From May 1, 2022, Suroboyo Bus don't use plastic waste payment because how impractical it is.

References

Surabaya
Transport companies established in 2018
Transport in East Java